Silandus or Silandos was an episcopal city in the late Roman province of Lydia. It was near and gave its name to the present town of Selendi in Manisa Province, Turkey.

Historical diocese 
The see of Silandus, a suffragan of the see of Sardis, is mentioned in the Greek Notitiae episcopatuum until the 13th century; the city is not mentioned by any ancient geographer or historian. We possess some of its coins representing the River Hermus. Some inscriptions but no ruins are now found there.

Residential Bishops 
The list of bishops of Silandus given by Le Quien, Oriens christianus, I, 881, needs correction:
Markus, present at the Council of Nicaea, 325;
Alcimedes at Chalcedon, 451;
Andreas, at the Council of Constantinople 680; Stephanus, at Constantinople, 787;
Eustathius, at Constantinople, 879.

The bishop mentioned as having taken part in the Council of Constantinople, 1351, belongs to the See of Synaus.

Titular bishopric 
The bishopric was nominally revived in 1900 as a Latin titular see of the lowest (episcopal) rank, but is vacant since 1968, after only two incumbents:
 Bishop Próspero París (姚宗李), S.J. (1900.04.06 – 1931.05.13)
 Bishop James Albert Duffy (1931.05.07 – 1968.02.12)

References 
 William Mitchell Ramsay, Asia Minor (London, 1890), 122;
 Texier, Asie mineure (Paris, 1862), 276.

Notes

Sourches and External links 
 Catholic Encyclopedia article
 GigaCatholic, with titular incumbent biography links
 

Populated places in ancient Lydia
Former populated places in Turkey
Roman towns and cities in Turkey
History of Manisa Province
Silandus